Takanori (written: 貴教, 貴紀, 貴徳, 貴則, 孝敬, 孝紀, 孝徳, 孝典, 孝憲, 孝法, 孝則, 隆典, 隆則, 陽功, 聖典, 雅男, 崇典 or 鎬則) is a masculine Japanese given name. Notable people with the name include:

, Japanese shogi player
, Japanese composer and arranger
, Japanese footballer
, Japanese neurosurgeon
, Japanese mixed martial artist
, Japanese shogi player
, Japanese boxer
, Japanese voice actor
, Japanese professional wrestler
, Japanese actor, film director and singer
, Japanese politician
, Japanese Nordic combined skier
, Japanese footballer
, Japanese footballer
, Japanese singer and actor
, Japanese footballer
, Japanese electrical engineer and composer
, Japanese voice actor and actor
, Japanese footballer
, Japanese triple jumper
, Japanese sumo wrestler

Japanese masculine given names